Peter Richard McKechnie (9 February 1941 – 26 May 2011) was an Australian politician.

He was born in Goondiwindi to Henry McKechnie and Heather May, née Coulton. He worked as a station hand from 1957 to 1958 and a property manager from 1961 to 1968 before becoming a grazier in Charters Towers. He married Jeanette Ruth Morwood on 23 May 1964, with whom he had two children. In April 1974 he became electoral secretary to his father, who was the Country Party member for Carnarvon in the Queensland Legislative Assembly. When his father retired at the election that year, Peter McKechnie was elected as his successor. In 1983 he was appointed Minister for Tourism, National Parks, Sport and the Arts, moving to Industry and Technology in 1986 and to Family Services and Welfare Housing in 1987. In January 1989 he became Minister for Transport, but in September announced his retirement from politics to care for his wife, who was ill. McKechnie died in Toowoomba in 2011.

References

1941 births
2011 deaths
National Party of Australia members of the Parliament of Queensland
Members of the Queensland Legislative Assembly